Amarilis Paula Alberti de Varennes e Mendonça (born 1 November 1955) is a Portuguese academic who is currently a professor at the University of Lisbon and president of the Instituto Superior de Agronomia.

She graduated from the Technical University of Lisbon in 1979 and completed her PhD entitled "Some aspects of the host involvement in cowpea mosaic virus replication" at the University of East Anglia in 1985.

References

1955 births
Living people
Technical University of Lisbon alumni
Alumni of the University of East Anglia
Academic staff of the University of Lisbon
Portuguese mycologists
Women botanists